Millard West High School is a public high school located in Omaha, Nebraska, United States. It first opened its doors on August 17, 1995. Currently, Millard West High School is the third largest school within the Millard Public Schools district.  In 2002, the school was designated as a National Blue Ribbon school of excellence. The school uses block scheduling, organizing classes in four blocks each day, changing four semesters (or quarters) a year.

In 2005, Millard voters approved the fourth-largest bond project in district history, providing $78 million for the construction of Horizon High School; renovations to all three high schools, one middle school and one elementary school; and the purchase of new land and technology. Of that, $6.2 million was appropriated to Millard West for the building of new classrooms and band room additions. These improvements were completed in the summer of 2007.

Athletics

Millard West's athletic teams have won the following state championships:

<p>
<p>
Millard West's athletic teams have won the following national championships:

Notable alumni 

 Chris Klein - Class of 1997; film actor (Election, Here on Earth, American Pie, Just Friends)
 Harrison Phillips - Minnesota Vikings Defensive Tackle
 Matt Longacre - Los Angeles Rams Outside Linebacker

References

External links
 Green Light newspaper online

Public high schools in Nebraska
Educational institutions established in 1995
1995 establishments in Nebraska
High schools in Omaha, Nebraska
Millard Public Schools